The 1945 North Dakota Agricultural Bison football team was an American football team that represented North Dakota Agricultural College (now known as North Dakota State University) in the North Central Conference (NCC) during the 1945 college football season.  In its second season under head coach Robert A. Lowe, the team compiled a 1–4–1 record. The team played its home games at Dacotah Field in Fargo, North Dakota.

Schedule

References

North Dakota Agricultural
North Dakota State Bison football seasons
North Dakota Agricultural Bison football